Liberty County Courthouse may refer to:

Liberty County Courthouse (Florida), Bristol, Florida
Liberty County Courthouse (Georgia), Hinesville, Georgia
Liberty County Courthouse (Texas), Liberty, Texas, listed on the National Register of Historic Places